Iga Świątek defeated Coco Gauff in the final, 6–1, 6–3 to win the women's singles tennis title at the 2022 French Open.
It was her second French Open title, and she dropped just one set en route, in the fourth round to Zheng Qinwen. With the win, Świątek extended her winning streak to 35 matches (dating back to the Qatar Open in February), equaling Venus Williams' tally from the 2000 season. Świątek also became the youngest winner of multiple majors since Maria Sharapova in 2006.

Barbora Krejčíková was the defending champion, but she lost in the first round to Diane Parry. This marked only the third time in French Open history that the defending champion lost in the first round (after Anastasia Myskina in 2005 and Jeļena Ostapenko in 2018), and the record fifteenth consecutive unsuccessful French Open women's singles title defense since 2007.

17-year-old Linda Nosková became the youngest qualifier to debut in the main draw since Michelle Larcher de Brito in 2009. This was the second time in the Open Era when only one out of the top ten seeds advanced to the fourth round of a major, after 2018 Wimbledon. 

This was the first edition of the French Open since 2004 to feature three Americans in the quarterfinals: Gauff, Jessica Pegula, and Sloane Stephens. With the losses of Leylah Fernandez and Stephens in the quarterfinals, a first-time major finalist was guaranteed from the bottom half of the draw; Gauff ultimately emerged as that finalist. She became the youngest major finalist since Sharapova at the 2004 Wimbledon Championships, and the youngest French Open finalist since Kim Clijsters in 2001.

This was the first edition of the tournament to feature a final set tiebreak. When the score in a final set reached 6–6, the first player to reach 10 points and lead by at least two points won the set (and the match). The first women's singles main draw match to feature the ten-point tie break was the first round match between Irina-Camelia Begu and Jasmine Paolini, with Begu emerging victorious.

Seeds

Draw

Finals

Top half

Section 1

Section 2

Section 3

Section 4

Bottom half

Section 5

Section 6

Section 7

Section 8

Championship match statistics

Seeded players 
The following are the seeded players. Seedings are based on WTA rankings as of 16 May 2022. Rankings and points before are as of 23 May 2022.

Unlike in the men's tournament, points from the 2021 women's tournament will be dropped at the end of this year's tournament, even though the 2021 tournament was held one week later than in 2022. Players will also be dropping points from the Strasbourg tournament held during the week of 24 May 2021. 

† The player did not qualify for the 2021 tournament. Accordingly, her 16th best result will be deducted instead.

Withdrawn players
The following players would have been seeded, but withdrew before the tournament began.

Other entry information

Wildcards 

Sources:

Protected ranking

Qualifiers

Lucky losers

Withdrawals 
Before the tournament

 – not included on entry list& – withdrew from entry list

Rank date: 11 April 2022
Source: 

During the tournament

Retirements

Explanatory notes

References

External links 
 Full Draw
 Roland-Garros 2022
 (WTA) tournament profile

Women's Singles
2022
French Open – Women's Singles